Chu Chang-kyun (November 7, 1921 – December 29, 2012) served as the President of the Korea Scout Association.
In 1988, Chu was awarded the 189th Bronze Wolf, the only distinction of the World Organization of the Scout Movement, awarded by the World Scout Committee for exceptional services to world Scouting.

See also

Dongbu Steel

References

External links

Recipients of the Bronze Wolf Award
1921 births
Scouting in South Korea
South Korean businesspeople
2012 deaths
People from North Pyongan